Tom Beissel (born 10 May 1994 in Nijmegen) is a Dutch professional footballer who currently plays as a right back for Blauw Geel '38.

Club career
Beissel joined Telstar in summer 2014 from the Vitesse academy but missed a large part of the 2015/16 season due to a knee injury.

References

External links
Profile - Telstar
 

1994 births
Living people
Footballers from Nijmegen
Association football fullbacks
Dutch footballers
SC Telstar players
De Treffers players
Eerste Divisie players
Tweede Divisie players
Blauw Geel '38 players
Juliana '31 players